Arsila may refer to:
 Asilah, Morocco
 Ərsilə, Azerbaijan